Goldfields South was an electoral district of the Legislative Assembly in the Australian state of New South Wales from 1859 to 1880, including the goldfields within several southern electorates. Rolls were not kept for goldfields seats, voters being able to establish their right to vote by presenting either a mining licence or business licence in a proclaimed gold field that had been held for at least six months. Voters could also appear on the roll for general districts, but were prevented from voting in both their resident general district and the overlaying goldfields district.

Members for Goldfields South

Election results

References

Former electoral districts of New South Wales
1859 establishments in Australia
Constituencies established in 1859
1880 disestablishments in Australia
Constituencies disestablished in 1880